BRQ may refer to:
 Brno–Tuřany Airport (IATA airport code: BRQ), airport in Brno, Czech Republic
 Buraq Air (ICAO airline code: BRQ), airline based in Tripoli, Libya
 Breri language (ISO 639-3 language code: brq), a Ramu language of Papua New Guinea
 B-R-Q, a given name of Semitic origin frequently spelled as "Barack", "Barak" or "Baraq"
 Bus request, a control bus signal